Sulaymaniya Sport club also written is a sports club based in Sulaymaniya, Kurdistan Region, Iraq. They currently play in the Iraq Division Two.

Club honours
Iraq Division One
Winners: 2011–12

Individual honours
2009 FIFA Confederations Cup
The following players have played in the FIFA Confederations Cup whilst playing for Sulaymaniya :
 2009 – Dara Mohammed
 2009 – Halgurd Mulla Mohammed

References

External links
 Official website (Kurdish)

1956 establishments in Iraq
Football clubs in Sulaymaniyah